William Henry Fizer (1861 - February 15, 1937)  was a trainer of Thoroughbred racehorses who won the 1907 Kentucky Derby with Pink Star, the 1908 Latonia Derby with Pinkola, and the 1909 Kentucky Oaks with Floreal.

Born in Kentucky, as a young man William Fizer made his home in Knoxville, Tennessee. He was in New York when he died on February 15, 1937. His remains were shipped to Knoxville for interment.

References

1861 births
1937 deaths 
American horse trainers
American racehorse owners and breeders
Sportspeople from Knoxville, Tennessee
People from Kentucky